Milan Doudera (born 1 January 1993) is a Czech professional ice hockey player. He is currently playing with HC Oceláři Třinec of the Czech Extraliga (ELH). Doudera made his Czech Extraliga debut playing with HC Oceláři Třinec during the 2014–15 season. His younger brother Lukáš is an ice hockey player.

References

External links
 

1993 births
Living people
Czech ice hockey defencemen
Rytíři Kladno players
Niagara IceDogs players
HC Oceláři Třinec players
People from Kladno District
Sportspeople from the Central Bohemian Region
Czech expatriate ice hockey players in Canada